Jukena (जुकेना) is an administration geography called VDC, (local level geo-political division) in Arghakhanchi District in the Lumbini Zone of southern Nepal. It is situated at the southern lap of Mahabharat mountain range and stretches toward south and west. It is surrounded by Dhanchaur, Thada, Siddhara and Jaluke VDCs in north, east, south and west consequently. It is adjacent to Western part of  Pyuthan district At the time of the 2011 Nepal census it had a population of 6,647 and had 1435 houses in the town.

References

Populated places in Arghakhanchi District